Saijō, Hiroshima may refer to:

Saijō, Hiroshima (Shōbara)
Saijō, Hiroshima (Kamo)